Swarthy Songs for Swabs is a 12"-EP by New Zealand band the 3Ds, released in 1990.

Track listing
"Sing-Song" – 2:19
"Bunny" – 1:52
"Ritual Tragick" – 3:15
"Meluzina Man" – 2:54
"Nimmo's Dream" – 2:41
"Grimace" – 2:03

References

The 3Ds albums
1990 EPs
Flying Nun Records EPs